Proboscidipparion is an extinct genus of horse that lived in Eurasia during the Pliocene around 7.1 - 4 million years ago.  It is known for having a rather elongated skull, in which some speculate to have had a proboscis similar to a tapir. Fossils have been found throughout Eurasia, from England to China.

References 

Prehistoric placental genera
Cenozoic mammals of Europe
Pliocene horses
Cenozoic mammals of Asia